André Wicky (22 May 1928 – 14 May 2016) was a Swiss racing driver, active from the late 1950s to the late 1970s. He was mainly involved in sports car racing, as an entrant and team owner as well as a driver, but also took part in several non-championship Formula One races during the 1960s.

Career
Wicky entered the 24 Hours of Le Mans in 1960 and 1961 with an AC Ace, winning the 2.0 GT class in 1960. He returned to Le Mans in 1966, and raced every year until 1975, campaigning Porsches. From 1969, he drove for his own team, the Wicky Racing Team, and his best overall result was 17th in 1971, driving a Porsche 908. The same year, Walter Brun finished seventh in a Wicky Porsche. Occasionally Wicky campaigned other marques besides Porsche; in 1974 he entered a BMW 3.0CSL for Brun, although it retired after one lap, and a De Tomaso Pantera for Max Cohen-Olivar and Philippe Carron, which retired after 16 laps.

From 1961, he participated in occasional Formula One races, first with a Cooper T53, but this car suffered engine failures in every race that Wicky entered. At the 1963 Mediterranean Grand Prix, he drove a Lotus 24 for Scuderia Filipinetti, and achieved his best Formula One result of ninth from 11th on the grid. He subsequently bought the Lotus and entered it in the next two Syracuse Grands Prix, but found little success with the car, only able to repeat his ninth-place finish in the 1965 race, albeit a distant last.

Racing record

24 Hours of Le Mans results

Complete Formula One non-championship results
(key)

References

1928 births
2016 deaths
Swiss racing drivers
Swiss Formula One drivers
24 Hours of Le Mans drivers
World Sportscar Championship drivers
Sportspeople from Lausanne
12 Hours of Reims drivers